Alonzo Albert Skinner (January 16, 1814 – April 30, 1877) was an American judge and Whig party politician in Oregon. He was the 16th justice of the Oregon Supreme Court and unsuccessful candidate for the office of governor. He also served as a circuit court judge for the state of Oregon, was a customs collector, a judge in the Provisional Government of Oregon, and a commissioner on a Native American treaty commission.

Early life
Skinner was born in Portage County, Ohio in 1814. There in the community of Ravenna he read law and passed the bar in 1840. He then settled in Putnam County, Ohio in 1842 and served as a part-time prosecutor in the county before losing the election for county judge. Then in 1845 Skinner set out over the Oregon Trail on a seven-month journey to immigrate to Oregon Country. He arrived later in 1845 in Oregon City, Oregon. Alonzo then set up farming in the Tuality District while still practicing law.

Political career
Beginning in December 1846 Skinner served as a circuit judge for the Provisional Government of Oregon. In that position he would travel from March through November to the county courts as a circuit rider. He was paid a salary of $800 per year for the job and served until 1849 when the Territorial Government arrived and judge Orville C. Pratt took over for Skinner. Later in 1849 Native Americans attacked and killed an American settler at Fort Steilacoom in Lewis County, after which chief justice William P. Bryant traveled to the fort for a trial of six defendants. Bryant brought along Skinner to serve as the prosecutor, and two of the six defendants were convicted and executed.

After this in June 1850 he became a member of an Indian Commission set up by the United States government to negotiate treaties with the tribes west of the Cascade Mountains in Oregon. However, Skinner and his fellow commissioners John P. Gaines and Beverly S. Allen were only able to get treaties signed that allowed the tribes to remain on the west side and in the foothills of the Willamette Valley. The commission ratified 19 treaties and was then disbanded in February 1851.

In 1851, Alonzo Skinner was appointed as an Indian agent by the government for Southern Oregon. In 1853 he ran against former governor Joseph Lane for the position of territorial delegate to Congress for the Oregon Territory. As a Whig party candidate Skinner lost to Lane the Democrat while calling for a transcontinental railroad in his campaign. Next in 1856 after moving to Pacific City, Washington, he married Elizabeth Hopkins Lincoln on May 22. Hopkins was a teacher in Vermont sent by Governor Slade to Oregon City. The two would then teach in Astoria, Oregon. Two years later the couple had moved to Willamina, Oregon in the Yamhill Valley where Alonzo had set up a land claim in 1850. The Skinners then moved to Eugene, Oregon where Alonzo returned to law practice. While in Eugene he served as the city's recorder and as a clerk for the county, elected to the latter as a Republican in 1862. During the American Civil War Skinner was an assistant provost marshal for the United States Army as a civilian.

Then in 1866, he was appointed by Oregon Governor George Lemuel Woods to the Oregon Supreme Court to replace Riley E. Stratton who had died in office. Skinner served on the state's highest court until 1867 when he was replaced by John Kelsay who had won the election.

Later life
After serving on the Supreme Court he then served as a circuit court judge for the state from 1867 to 1870. Skinner was then appointed as a customs collector for the United States at Empire City, Oregon. However, he suffered from bad health and moved to California in 1877 to attempt to improve his health, but died that year on April 30 in Santa Barbara, California.

References

Justices of the Oregon Supreme Court
Oregon state court judges
1814 births
1877 deaths
People from Ravenna, Ohio
Members of the Provisional Government of Oregon
United States Indian agents
Oregon pioneers
Oregon Whigs
19th-century American politicians
Politicians from Eugene, Oregon
Oregon Republicans
California Republicans
Lawyers from Eugene, Oregon
U.S. state supreme court judges admitted to the practice of law by reading law
19th-century American judges
19th-century American lawyers